Jang Jong-hyok (born 26 August 1980) is a North Korean former footballer. He represented North Korea on at least five occasions between 2001 and 2003.

Career statistics

International

References

1980 births
Living people
North Korean footballers
North Korea international footballers
Association football goalkeepers